

Offseason
September 20: In the preseason Hockey East poll, the Huskies were ranked fifth. Northeastern earned 34 points, one point behind fourth-place New Hampshire.

Recruiting

Exhibition

News and notes
Former players Lindsay Berman, Annie Hogan and Cassie Sperry are all members of the Boston franchise in the Canadian Women's Hockey League. The three played together for Northeastern from 2006 to 2010.

News and notes
In the opening weekend series, Katie MacSorley scored two straight goals in the season opener. The goal gave the Huskies a 4–3 lead over Syracuse. MacSorley nearly had a hat trick in overtime. She finished the weekend with a plus-1 rating and 10 total shots.
October 16: Northeastern beat the Colonials by a 4–3 margin in the RMU Hockey Showcase at CONSOL Energy Center. It was the first RMU Hockey Showcase at CONSOL Energy Center.
Oct. 24: Julia Marty's four-point performance was the first by a Huskies player since Chelsey Jones recorded five points against the Maine Black Bears on Dec. 3, 2006.
Week of November 1: Florence Schelling made 58 saves on the week for a .951 save percentage. She recorded 34 saves to record her first shutout of the season against Yale, 4–0. She made 24 saves in a loss to Boston College on Wednesday night at Matthews Arena.
November 21: On November 21, McSorley recorded her first career hat trick and added two assists as the Huskies prevailed by a 5–1 tally over the Providence Friars. The hat trick was the first hat trick for a Northeastern player since Julia Marty in 2008. It was also the first five-point game by a Husky since Chelsey Jones tallied five points against Maine on Dec. 3, 2006.
Dec . 1: Freshman Rachel Llanes scored the first and last goal of the game in Northeastern’s 4–0 win over New Hampshire with six shots on goal. It was her first-ever multi-goal game. Another freshman, Katie MacSorley scored a goal in the 4–0 win over New Hampshire. Florence Schelling made 22 saves for her third shutout of the season. With the win, Northeastern snapped a 27-game unbeaten streak (0–26–1) against New Hampshire. Their last win over New Hampshire was Jan. 21, 2001, a 2–1 win. In addition, the fact that it was a shutout victory marks the first over UNH in the history of the program.
December 7: Florence Schelling made a season-high 37 saves in a 3–0 loss versus Boston  University.*Heading into the holiday break, every win except the 2–1 victory over Princeton on Oct. 22 has meant that a Husky rookie has recorded at least one point.
January 1: In the first game of the Easton Holiday Showcase, freshman Maggie Brennolt registered her first collegiate goal. She also added an assist in a 7–2 loss to the No. 2 ranked Wisconsin Badgers. Florence Schelling  recorded 29 saves in two periods of play but was replaced by Leah Sulyma. In the third, Sulyma made 12 saves.
January 2: Dani Rylan scored her first Division 1 goal as the Huskies broke a 1–1 tie with 3:36 remaining in the third period. The Huskies would hold on to the lead versus St. Cloud State and win by a 2–1 tally in their final game of the Easton Holiday Showcase. The win snapped a two-game losing streak.

Rylan now has seven points and ensured that a newcomer has scored a point in all but one Husky victory of the season. It is the second-straight game in which a Huskies player scored a goal for the first time at the Division 1 level. Goaltender Florence Schelling recorded a season-high 39 saves, and recorded her 10th win of the season.
January 3: Florence Schelling will compete for Switzerland in the 2011 MLP Cup, an under-22 tournament. She will compete from Jan. 4–8.
March 5: Florence Schelling set a Hockey East tournament record with 44 saves, including a record 24 in the first period. The Huskies upset No. 1 seed Boston University by a 4–2 tally at Walter Brown Arena. Alyssa Wohlfeiler tallied two goals and Claire Santostefano potted the game-winning goal.

Regular season

Standings

Schedule
The Huskies will play the Robert Morris Colonials in the College Hockey Showcase at Consol Energy Centre on October 17.
From January 1 to 2, the Huskies competed in the Easton Holiday Showcase in St. Cloud, Minnesota.
The women's Beanpot will feature the Huskies from February 8 to the 15th.

Player stats

Skaters

Postseason

Hockey East tournament

Awards and honors
Rachel Llanes, Runner-up: Hockey East, Pro Ambitions Rookie of the Month (October 2010)
Katie MacSorley, Northeastern Student-Athlete of the week for Sept. 27-Oct. 3.
Katie MacSorley, Runner-up: Hockey East, Pro Ambitions Rookie of the Month (October 2010)
Katie MacSorley, Co-Hockey East Player of the Week (Week of November 22)
Casey Pickett, Hockey East Pure Hockey Player of the Week, (Week of February 28, 2011)
Dani Rylan, Northeastern University Student Athlete of the Week (Week of January 3, 2011) 
Florence Schelling, Hockey East Defensive Player of the Week (Week of November 8)
Florence Schelling, Hockey East Defensive Player of the Week (Week of February 28)
Florence Schelling, Hockey East Defensive Player of the Week (Week of March 7)

Postseason
Turfer Athletic Award: Northeastern University

All-Rookie team
F: Katie MacSorley, Northeastern

Team awards
Alyssa Wohlfeiler, Team MVP 
Maggie DiMasi, Rookie of the Year honors
Casey Pickett, Kathryn Waldo 7th Player Award 
Autumn Prouty, Coaches Award 
 Siena Falino, Academic Award

References

N
N
Northeastern Huskies women's ice hockey seasons